Angelo Paravisi (15 September 1930 – 2 September 2004) was the bishop of Crema from 1996 to 2004.

Life 

Born in Bergamo in the quarter of Colognola, he attended the seminary and was ordained priest for the Diocese of Bergamo in 1953. After his ordination he held various posts in his native diocese, then from 1964 to 1970 he led the Azione Cattolica of his diocese. From 1976 to 1988 he led the parish of Seriate and in 1988 pope John Paul II named him auxiliary bishop of the Diocese of Bergamo. In 1996 he was named bishop of Crema.
He died on 2 September 2004 at the age of 73.

References

1930 births
2004 deaths
Clergy from Bergamo
Bishops of Crema
20th-century Italian Roman Catholic bishops
21st-century Italian Roman Catholic bishops